"Move Bitch" (marketed as "Move B***h" or simply "Move") is the fourth official single from American rapper Ludacris' album Word of Mouf. The single features American rappers Mystikal and I-20. The single reached number 10 on the Billboard Hot 100, making it Ludacris's first top-ten hit on the chart. It also reached number 3 on the Hot Rap Tracks chart and number 3 on the Hot R&B/Hip-Hop Singles & Tracks chart.  Also, it featured in an episode of the TV series Castle. Retired NBA star and now ESPN analyst Jalen Rose is featured in the music video.

Legacy
The song has been covered by rock band Start Trouble, on their album Every Solution Has Its Problem. It was sampled by Girl Talk on the first track of his album All Day, "Oh No". Puerto Rican reggaeton duo Maicol & Manuel sampled the song on "Hoy Me Levanté" on their 2002 release Yakaleo. German Hip Hop group 257ers  has sampled the song on Aus Dem Weg of the album Boomshakkalakka.

The song was referenced in chants by people protesting U.S. President George W. Bush, who changed the words to “Move, Bush, get out the way!” starting with protests of the 2003 Iraq War.

Usage in media
The song was referenced in Bad Boys II when Will Smith and Martin Lawrence characters are questioning a young man who had come to take the daughter to Martin Lawrence's character out on a date.

The song was also featured in the opening scenes of Hancock, which also starred Will Smith.

Charts

Weekly charts

Year-end charts

References

2001 songs
2002 singles
Ludacris songs
Mystikal songs
I-20 (rapper) songs
Def Jam Recordings singles
Songs written by Ludacris